Olivia is the second book in The Girls series by Rosie Rushton. It was published in 1997 by Piccadilly Press.

Plot summary 
Olivia's parents are separated. Her father has a mistress, Rosalie, with whom he now lives. Olivia's mother is upset because of it, but she does not want her husband to come back. At school, Olivia has a problem, because she was chosen to organise a school theatre. She does not like the idea and she tells the headmaster that she will not face the challenge. Luke - Poppy's boyfriend - does the same thing. Once, Hayley, Livi's friend, invites her to the Stomping Ground night club. Before this, she goes to a dinner with her father and Rosalie. Livi changes her opinion about Rosalie, because she realises that she can have problems, too (Rosalie's mother makes problems, because she has Alzheimer's disease).

Once, while coming back from school, Olivia meets Ryan - a handsome boy, who lives with his mother on a boat in summer. She meets him at Stomping Ground, where they dance together. Livi starts to fall in love with him. But she cannot invite him to come to her house, because her mother gets a new person to live with them - Leonora. Olivia does not like her, but a few weeks later, Ryan tells her that Leo is his aunt.

Some time later, Ryan invites his mother to go with him to Olivia's. Livi finds out that, Ryan is her elder brother. She is disappointed, but she falls in love with another boy from her school. Livi's parents are going to get divorced.

Characters 
Olivia "Livi" Hunter - a 14-year-old student of Bellborough Court. She plays the piano. Her friend, Poppy Field, has moved to Lee Hill, because her parents don't have enough money to pay school fees. Her parents get divorced. Livi fell in love with Ryan, but soon she realises that he's her brother.
Judy Hunter (Joplin) - Livi's mother. She's an artist. 
Mike Hunter - Livi's and Ryan's father. He lives with his new mistress, Rosalie.
Cordelia French - Ryan's mother.
Ryan French - Livi's half brother. 
Tasha Reilly - Adam's sister. She moved to England from Singapore, but she didn't want to do that. Her mother is Indian.
Adam Reilly - Tasha's elder brother. He started to hate everything Indian, when his father went to prison. He started to drink alcohol, too. He was Livi's and Abby's boyfriend.
Leonora Tadcaster - Ryan's aunt. She rents a room at Livi's.
Nimala Devi - Tasha's and Adam's grandmother.
Abigail Lane - a girl from Livi's class. She is pretty and every boy likes her. She was Adam's girlfriend, but when she realised he's half-Indian, she broke up with him.
Hayley Spicer - Livi's new friend.
Tamsin - a girl from Livi's class.
Poppy Field - Livi's best friend.
Luke Cunningham - Poppy's boyfriend. He had to organise a school theatre with Livi. 
Vanessa Cross - Cordelia's business partner.
Sophie Cross - Vanessa's daughter. Olivia's new friend.

1997 British novels
British young adult novels
Novels by Rosie Rushton